The 34th Los Angeles Film Critics Association Awards, given by the Los Angeles Film Critics Association (LAFCA), honored the best in film for 2008. Pixar's animated film WALL-E won the Best Film award and became the first-ever animated film to do so; however, the film lost the Best Animated Film award to Waltz with Bashir.

Winners

Best Picture:
 WALL-E 
Runner-up: The Dark Knight
Best Director:
Danny Boyle – Slumdog Millionaire
Runner-up: Christopher Nolan – The Dark Knight
Best Actor:
Sean Penn – Milk
Runner-up: Mickey Rourke – The Wrestler
Best Actress:
Sally Hawkins – Happy-Go-Lucky
Runner-up: Melissa Leo – Frozen River
Best Supporting Actor:
Heath Ledger – The Dark Knight (posthumously)
Runner-up: Eddie Marsan – Happy-Go-Lucky
Best Supporting Actress:
Penélope Cruz – Elegy and Vicky Cristina Barcelona
Runner-up: Viola Davis – Doubt
Best Screenplay:
Mike Leigh – Happy-Go-Lucky
Runner-up: Charlie Kaufman – Synecdoche, New York
Best Cinematography:
Yu Lik-wai – Still Life (Sanxia haoren)
Runner-up: Anthony Dod Mantle – Slumdog Millionaire
Best Production Design:
Mark Friedberg – Synecdoche, New York
Runner-up: Nathan Crowley – The Dark Knight
Best Music Score:
A. R. Rahman – Slumdog Millionaire
Runner-up: Alexandre Desplat – The Curious Case of Benjamin Button
Best Foreign-Language Film:
Still Life (Sanxia haoren) – China/Hong Kong
Runner-up: The Class (Entre les murs) – France
Best Documentary/Non-Fiction Film:
Man on Wire
Runner-up: Waltz with Bashir (Vals im Bashir)
Best Animation:
Waltz with Bashir (Vals im Bashir)
The Douglas Edwards Experimental/Independent Film/Video Award:
James Benning – RR and Casting a Glance
New Generation Award:
Steve McQueen – Hunger

References

External links
 34th Annual Los Angeles Film Critics Association Awards

2008
Los Angeles Film Critics Association Awards
Los Angeles Film Critics Association Awards
Los Angeles Film Critics Association Awards
Los Angeles Film Critics Association Awards